The Bihu dance is an indigenous folk dance from the Indian state of Assam related to the Bihu festival and an important part of Assamese culture. Performed in a group, the Bihu dancers are usually young men and women, and the dancing style is characterized by brisk steps, and rapid hand movements. The traditional costume of dancers is colorful and centered round the red color theme, signifying joy and vigour.

History
The origins of the dance form is unknown, however the folk dance tradition has always been very significant in the culture of Assam's diverse ethnic groups, such as Kaivarttas, Deoris, Sonowal Kacharis, Chutias, Boros, Misings, Rabhas, Moran and Borahis, among others. According to scholars, the Bihu dance has its origin in ancient fertility cults that was associated with increasing the fertility of the demographic as well as the land. Traditionally, local farming communities performed the dance outdoors, in fields, groves, forests or on the banks of rivers, especially under the fig tree.

The earliest depiction of Bihu dance is found in the 9th century sculptures found in the Tezpur and Darrang districts of Assam. Bihu is mentioned in the inscriptions of the 14th century Chutia King Lakshminaryan as well.

Description

The dance begins with the performers, young men and women, slowly walking into the performance space. The men then start playing musical instruments, like drums (particularly the double-headed dhol), horn-pipes and flutes, while the women place their hands above their hips with their palms facing outwards, forming an inverted triangular shape. The women then start to slowly move in tune with the music by swaying, while bending slightly forward from the waist. Gradually, they open up the shoulders and place their legs slightly apart, adopting the main posture used in the Bihu dance. Meanwhile, the music played by the men picks up in temp and intensity, leading women to thrust forward their breasts and pelvis, alternatively, to the tune.

Some variations include men and women forming lines that face one other by holding each other's neck or waist, with more advanced sequences of the dance including men and women pairing up at the center of the performance area and dancing in a manner that imitates copulation.

Cultural and social importance 
The Bihu dance takes its name from the Bohag Bihu festival (also called Rangali Bihu), the national festival of Assam., which celebrates the Assamese New Year. The festival takes place during mid-April and the Bihu dance is meant to celebrate and emulate the seasonal spirit, celebrating fertility and passion.

Bihu is performed by groups of young men and women and in earlier times it served principally as a courtship dance. The Bihu dance's association with fertility refers to both human fertility, through the erotic nature of the dance, as well as to the fertility of nature, meaning the celebration of spring and the welcoming of the life-giving spring rain. The use of instruments such as drums and horn-pipes is believed to replicate the sound of rain and thunder, as a way of invoking actual precipitation.

Historically, there is evidence that the Bihu dance was looked down upon in Assamese society, especially during colonial times, because of the sexually-charged nature of the performance, which clashed with the Victorian views that were dominant at the time among British colonists.
Presently, the Bihu dance continues to play an important role and is a cultural emblem in the modern–day Assamese society, becoming a symbol of the Assamese cultural identity. While prior to independence, it has been chiefly a rural phenomenon, the dance has managed to make to remain relevant in the face of increasing urbanization, with the practice being adopted in the region's urban centers. The first time that the Bihu dance was performed on a stage was in 1962, part of a cultural event that took place in Guwahati.

See also
Culture of Assam
Bihu festivals

References

External links 

 A sample of a Bihu dance performance, from youtube.
 Other Indian Folk Dances of Various parts of India.
Rati Bihu : A kind of bihu dance celebrated by People in Assam.

Bibliography

 
 

Dances of Assam
Culture of Assam
Indian folk dances
Group dances